The Mississippi Valley State Delta Devils basketball team represents Mississippi Valley State University in Itta Bena, Mississippi, in NCAA Division I competition. The school's team competes in the Southwestern Athletic Conference and plays home games in the Harrison HPER Complex.

The Delta Devils are currently coached by George Ivory.

Postseason results

NCAA tournament results

The Delta Devils have appeared in five NCAA tournaments. Their combined record is 0–5.

NIT results
The Delta Devils have appeared in one National Invitation Tournament (NIT). Their record is 0–1.

Delta Devils in the NBA
 Alphonso Ford

References

External links
 Official website